Vásárosbéc (Croatian: Wetz) is a village in Baranya county, Hungary. The village has a population of 174 people.Vásárosbéc Population Density	7.2 /km² (18.8 /sq mi)

References 
 https://en.db-city.com/Hungary--Baranya--Szigetv%C3%A1r--V%C3%A1s%C3%A1rosb%C3%A9c

Populated places in Baranya County